An irreversible agonist is a type of agonist that binds permanently to a receptor in such a manner that the receptor is permanently activated.  It is distinct from a mere (reversible) agonist in that the association of an agonist to a receptor is reversible, whereas the binding of an irreversible agonist to a receptor is, at least in theory, irreversible. Oxymorphazone is an example of an irreversible agonist. In practice, the distinction may be more a matter of degree, in which the binding affinity of an irreversible agonist is some orders of magnitude greater than that of an agonist.

Examples 
 Oxymorphazone
 Metaphit

See also 
 Agonist
 Irreversible antagonist
 Irreversible enzyme inhibitor

References 

Receptor agonists